EEHS may refer to:
 Emergency Evacuation Hyperbaric Stretcher
 Edcouch-Elsa High School, Elsa, Texas, United States
 Epsom and Ewell High School, Epsom, Surrey, England